Antonella Romano (born 1962) is a French historian of science known for her research on science and the Catholic Church, and in particular on the scientific and mathematical work of the Society of Jesus (Jesuits) in the Renaissance.

Education
She went to Paris-Sorbonne University for her undergraduate studies, earned a master's degree in history and a licence in geography in 1984, and then earned a diplôme d'études approfondies in 1989 at the University of Paris 1 Pantheon-Sorbonne, studying the scientific contributions of the Jesuits under the supervision of Daniel Roche. Continuing with Roche, she completed a doctorate in 1996; her dissertation was Les jésuites et la révolution scientifique. In 2013 she earned a habilitation at the School for Advanced Studies in the Social Sciences. Her habilitation thesis was Europe catholique, sciences, mission à l’époque moderne.

Career
In 1997 she became a researcher at the Alexandre Koyré Centre, and in 2005 she went on leave from the center to take a chair in the history of sciences at the European University Institute in Florence. In 2013 she returned to the Alexandre Koyré Centre as a director of studies, and in 2014 she became the director of the center.

From 2018 to 2020 she has been vice-president for international relations of the School for Advanced Studies in the Social Sciences.

Selected works

Books
Impressions de Chine: L’Europe et l’englobement du monde (16e-17e siècles) (Fayard, 2016; Spanish translation Impressiones de China: Europa y el englobamiento del mundo, Marcial Pons, 2018)
La contre-réforme mathématique: Constitution et diffusion d’un culture mathématique jésuite à la Renaissance (1540-1640) [The mathematical Counter-Reformation: Constitution and diffusion of a Jesuit mathematical culture during the Renaissance (1540–1640)] (École française de Rome, 1999)

Edited volumes
Rome et la science moderne: Entre Renaissance et Lumières (École française de Rome, 2008)
Escrituras de la modernidad: Los jesuitas entre cultura retórica y cultura científica (edited with Perla Chinchilla, Univ. Iberoamericana / EHESS, 2008)
Naples, Rome, Florence: Une histoire comparée des intellectuels italiens (edited with Jean Boutier and Brigitte Marin, École française de Rome, 2005)

Translations
She has also translated a book by Paolo Prodi into French as Christianisme et monde moderne: Cinquante ans de recherches (EHESS, 2006).

Recognition
In 2001, Romano won the prize for young historians of the International Academy of the History of Science for her book La contre-réforme mathématique. She became a corresponding member of the academy in 2019.

Romano was given the Médaille de la Ville de Tours in 2012 "for her work on Renaissance studies".

References

1962 births
Living people
20th-century French historians
French women historians
Historians of science
Italian–French translators
21st-century French historians